"Soaked" is a 2018 song by Benee.

"Soaked" may also refer to:

 "Soaked", a song by Adam Lambert from the album For Your Entertainment, 2009
 "Soaked", a song by Pinback from the album Summer in Abaddon, 2004
 Soaked!, an expansion pack for the video game RollerCoaster Tycoon 3, 2004

See also
 Soak (disambiguation)
 Soaking (disambiguation)